Derwent is a hamlet in central Alberta, Canada within the County of Two Hills No. 21.

Derwent dissolved from village status to become a hamlet on September 1, 2010. It originally incorporated as a village on June 25, 1930.

Demographics 

Location 
Derwent lies 41 km north of Vermilion, 35 km south of Elk Point, 20 km east of Myrnam, and 38 km west of Dewberry on Highway 45, 7 km west of Highway 41.

History 
Established in 1928 when the Canadian Pacific Railway opened a rail line through the region, it was named after Derwent, Derbyshire, England. Prior to this name, the community was briefly known as Monkman (purportedly after the temporary stay in the community of Albert Monkman, an important member of the 1885 Metis Provisional Government headed by Louis Riel) and, before that, the Native Americans of the region referred to it as Penguix. The population peaked at 301 in 1959, but declined rapidly after the construction of the bridge to Elk Point and the closure of the local grain elevator. The subsequent abandonment of the Lloydminster to Starr rail line in 2005 - 2007 signaled the final chapter in Derwent's rail access. Only two new homes have been built since the 1980s and the last business building permit issued was in 2001.

Education 
There are no schools currently operating in Derwent. The nearest public school is New Myrnam School (K-12) in Myrnam.

See also 
List of communities in Alberta
List of former urban municipalities in Alberta
List of hamlets in Alberta

References 

2010 disestablishments in Alberta
County of Two Hills No. 21
Designated places in Alberta
Former villages in Alberta
Hamlets in Alberta
Populated places established in 1928
Populated places disestablished in 2010